Canada competed at the 2012 Summer Paralympics in London, United Kingdom, from 29 August to 9 September 2012. A total of 145 athletes were sent by the Canadian Paralympic Committee to compete in 15 sports. The country won 31 medals in total and finished twentieth in the medals table, below the CPC's goal on a top eight finish in total gold medals. The total medals and total golds are the lowest totals for Canada since the 1972 Games.

Medalists

Archery

Men

|-
|align=left|Norbert Murphy
|align=left|Individual compound W1
|623
|6
| 
|W 6–2
|W 6–0
|L 7–3
|W 6–1
|
|-
|align=left|Kevin Evans
|align=left rowspan="2"|Individual compound open
|626
|25
|W 6–4
|L 6–4
|colspan="4"| did not advance
|-
|align=left|Bob Hudson
|629
|23
|L 6–0
|colspan="5"| did not advance
|}

Women

|-
|align=left|Karen van Nest
|align=left|Individual compound open
|643
|6
|
|L 6–5
|colspan=4| did not advance
|-
|align=left|Lyne Tremblay
|align=left|Individual recurve W1/W2
|423
|20
|L 6–0
|colspan=5| did not advance
|}

Athletics

Men's track

Men's field

Women's track

Boccia

Individual

Pairs and teams

Cycling

Road

Track

Goalball

Men's tournament

Group B

Women's tournament

Group D

Quarter-final

Judo

Rowing

Qualification legend: FA=Final A (medal); FB=Final B (non-medal); R=Repechage

Sailing

Shooting

Swimming

Men

Women

Wheelchair basketball

Canada have qualified one men's team and one women's team in wheelchair basketball through their results at the 2010 Wheelchair Basketball World Championship. Competing athletes are given an eight-level-score specific to wheelchair basketball, ranging from 0.5 to 4.5 with lower scores representing a higher degree of disability. The sum score of all players on the court cannot exceed 14.

Men's tournament

Group play

Quarter-final

Semi-final

Gold medal match

Women's tournament

Group play

Quarter-final

Semi-final for 5th–8th place

5th/6th place match

Wheelchair fencing

Wheelchair rugby

Group stage

Semi-finals

Gold medal match

Wheelchair tennis

See also
2012 Summer Paralympics
Canada at the Paralympics
Canada at the 2012 Summer Olympics

Notes

Nations at the 2012 Summer Paralympics
2012
Paralympics